The Stadthuys (an old Dutch spelling, meaning city hall) is a historical structure situated in the heart of Malacca City, the administrative capital of the state of Malacca, Malaysia in a place known as the Red Square. The Stadhuys is known for its red exterior and nearby red clocktower. It was built by the Dutch in 1650 as the office of the Dutch Governor and Deputy Governor.

When Malacca was handed over to the British in the 19th century, the Malacca Free School was opened in the vicinity of the Stadthuys on 7 December 1826, by missionaries residing in the state, in response to a letter dated 19 April 1825, signed by a J. Humprey, J. W. Overee and A. W. Baumgarten, which called for an English educational institution to be built in Malacca. The school which the British provided free education to residents was eventually renamed Malacca High School in 1871 upon a takeover by the British government, and moved out to its present site at Chan Koon Cheng Road in 1931.

Situated at Laksamana Road, beside the Christ Church, the supposed oldest remaining Dutch historical building in the Orient, is now home to the History and Ethnography Museum. Among the displays in the museum are traditional costumes and artifacts throughout the history of Malacca, which makes it Malacca's premier museum.

See also
 Christ Church, Malacca
Francis Xavier

References

External links

 Tourism Malaysia - Stadthuys
 The Stadthuys of Malacca, Holland Focus
 Dutch Square (The Stadthuys), AmazingMelaka.com
 Video: 5 short clips of Melaka Stadthuys square

Buildings and structures in Malacca City
Museums in Malacca
Seats of local government
Viceregal residences
Dutch colonial architecture
Dutch colonization in Asia
Buildings and structures completed in 1650
Former properties of the Dutch East India Company
1650 establishments in the Dutch Empire
Buildings and structures associated with the Dutch East India Company